is a city located on the island of Tanegashima, in Kagoshima Prefecture, Japan. As of June 2013, the city has an estimated population of 16,418 and a population density of 79.8 persons per km2. The total area is 205.75 km2.

Geography
Nishinoomote, located on the northern portion of Tanegashima, is bordered by the East China Sea to the west and the Pacific Ocean to the east, and by the Osumi Strait separating Tanegashima from the Kyushu mainland. The city also includes the offshore island of Mageshima within its borders.

Climate
Nishinoomote has a humid subtropical climate (Köppen climate classification Cfa) with long, hot, humid summers and mild winters. Precipitation is abundant throughout the year, with particularly heavy rainfall in May, June, August and September. The area is subject to frequent typhoons.

Surrounding municipalities
Nakatane

History

Kitatane Village was established on April 1, 1889. It was elevated to town status on April 1, 1926 and renamed Nishinoomote. Towards the end of World War II, the town was garrisoned by a 12,000-man force from the Imperial Japanese Army and was thus subjected to bombing by the United States Navy in 1945. It was elevated to city status on October 1, 1958.

Transportation

Seaport
Nishinoomote Port is a regional transportation hub, with frequent ferry service to Kagoshima, Tokyo, Kobe, and Osaka, as well as Okinawa and the other Osumi islands.

Highway
National Route 58

Sister cities
  Isa, Kagoshima, since November 10, 1962
  Sakai, Osaka, since October 18, 1986
  Nagahama, Shiga, since October 8, 1987
  Vila do Bispo, Portugal, since October 1, 1993 (in recognition of the fact that it was Fernão Mendes Pinto, a Portuguese explorer, who claimed to be the first European to set foot on Japan, and did so on Tanegashima in 1543.)

References

External links

 

Cities in Kagoshima Prefecture
Port settlements in Japan
Populated coastal places in Japan